Robinson Branch is a stream in Bourbon County, Kansas, in the United States.

Robinson Branch was named after a local pioneer.

See also
List of rivers of Kansas

References

Rivers of Bourbon County, Kansas
Rivers of Kansas